Aqrab (also spelled Akrab) is a Town in northwestern Syria, administratively part of the Hama Governorate, located southwest of Hama. Nearby localities include Nisaf and Baarin to the west, Awj to the southwest, Qarmas to the south, Taldou and Houla to the southeast, Talaf and the subdistrict (nahiyah) center Hirbnafsah to the east, Bisin and Jidrin to the northeast and al-Bayyadiyah to the northwest.

According to the Syria Central Bureau of Statistics (CBS), Aqrab had a population of 8,422 in the 2004 census, making it the largest locality in the Hirbnafsah nahiyah. The population of Aqrab is roughly two-thirds Sunni Muslim, with the remainder being Alawites. Many of Aqrab's Sunni inhabitants are of Turkmen descent, while Alawites live mostly in the enclave of Jbeili where they make up about 200 families.

In a 1958 United Nations report, it was noted that Aqrab had been owned by feudalists.

Syrian civil war

Since the beginning of the ongoing Syrian civil war in 2011, several Alawite families threatened by Sunni rebel fighters have fled Aqrab for nearby predominantly Alawite villages such as Baarin. On 11 December 2012, bomb attacks in the village left between 125-200 civilians dead or wounded according to opposition activists. Most of the casualties were reportedly Alawites, and local witnesses blamed FSA rebels from Houla and Al-Rastan for the killings.

References

Bibliography

Populated places in Hama District
Towns in Hama Governorate